The 2019–20 Basketball Championship of Bosnia and Herzegovina was the 19th season of this championship, with 12 teams from Bosnia and Herzegovina participating in it. HKK Široki were the defending champion. On 13 March 2020, season was ended prematurely because of the coronavirus pandemic, naming Igokea as new champion.

Competition format 
Twelve teams would join the regular season, played with as double round-robin tournament. Igokea joined the competition, although they declined to participate previous season.

Teams and locations 

Čapljina Lasta, Leotar, and Promo DV were promoted from the previous season.

Regular season

Standings

Results

References

Basketball Championship of Bosnia and Herzegovina
Bosnia
Bas